Peter Menzies may refer to:

 Peter Menzies (philosopher) (1953–2015), Australian philosopher
 Peter Menzies Jr., Australian cinematographer